Kearny is a town in the western part of Hudson County, New Jersey, United States and a suburb of Newark. As of the 2020 United States census, the town's population was 41,999, an increase of 1,315 (+3.2%) from the 2010 census count of 40,684, which in turn reflected an increase of 171 (+0.4%) from the 40,513 counted in the 2000 Census.

Kearny is named after Civil War general Philip Kearny. It began as a township formed by an act of the New Jersey Legislature on April 8, 1867, from portions of Harrison Township. Portions of the township were taken on July 3, 1895, to form East Newark. Kearny was incorporated as a town on January 19, 1899, based on the results of a referendum held two days earlier. The Arlington section of town was named for Arlington Station on the Erie Railroad at the Arlington Mill plant, owned by Arlington Mills of Lawrence, Massachusetts.

History

Colonial roots
The area of Kearny Township, created in 1867, had been part of the original Crown Grant of  obtained by Major William Sandford of Barbados on July 4, 1668. Major Sandford named it New Barbadoes Neck after his old home. As was the custom of the time, the Major paid 20 pounds sterling to Chief Tantaqua of the Hackensack tribe for all their reserve rights and titles.

Sanford's Uncle, Major Nathaniel Kingsland acquired the property in 1708 and sold the upper western tract of the Grant for 300 pounds sterling to Captain Arent Schuyler two years later. The new purchase included present-day Kearny, North Arlington, Lyndhurst and Kingsland.

Shortly after Schuyler's purchase of his new homestead, a peculiar green stone was uncovered. It was sent to England for analysis and he learned that it contained 80% copper. His opening of a copper mine brought the first steam engine to America from England; it was used to pump out the deep mine shaft. The engine was secretly delivered by its engineer, Josiah Hornblower. The engine and mines were destroyed by fire in 1772 and remained idle for some years.

Schuyler Mansion played a role during the American Revolutionary War Era. When Lord Howe of England took possession of New York Harbor, the proximity of Schuyler Mansion drew many of his officers. They generally traveled over a road that today is referred to as the Belleville Turnpike, which was originally constructed in 1759 using cedar logs from the nearby swamps.

During September 1777, General Henry Clinton, head of the British Expeditionary Forces in America, selected Schuyler Mansion for his headquarters during one of his more important raiding operations, which included the famed Battle of Second River. The Mansion stood until 1924, a period of 214 years, when it was torn-down by a land development company, despite the company's offers to transfer the land to an organization that would be able to pay to maintain the property.

19th century

In the middle 19th century, Kearny was the upper, or northern, section of the Township of Harrison. A prominent citizen and resident of the upper section, General N. M. Halsted, felt it was impossible under these political conditions for his section to obtain proper recognition. He engaged an energetic campaign for an independent township. He succeeded when the NJ Legislature of 1867 on March 14, adopted "an act creating the Township of Kearny". The town was named to honor Major General Philip Kearny, Commander of the New Jersey Forces in the Civil War and the owner of the mansion known as Belle Grove (or Belgrove), locally called "Kearny Castle".

On April 8, 1867, the first election of town officers was held. General N. M. Halsted was elected Chairman. The first official seat of Government was three rooms in the old Lodi Hotel, on the northeast corner of Schuyler and Harrison Avenues.

In the early 1870s, Kearny erected its first Town Hall, on the corner of Kearny and Woodland Avenues, the present site of the Knox Presbyterian Church Parish Hall. This served as a Town Hall, Court House, and Schoolhouse. The Minute Book of the Township states on August 16, 1870, the first step toward establishing Kearny's present public school system was taken. The first schoolhouse was housed in the Town Hall built at Kearny and Woodland Avenues in 1873.

The Highland Hose No. 4 firehouse, listed on the National Register of Historic Places, was built in 1895.

The town's nickname, "Soccer Town, U.S.A." is derived from a soccer tradition that originated in the mid-1870s, when thousands of Scottish and Irish immigrants settled in the town, after two Scottish companies, Clark Thread Company and Nairn Linoleum, opened two local mills and a factory.

When the town's growth demanded larger quarters, the present Kearny Town Hall, built of Indiana limestone, was erected in 1909.

Factory town

The early influx and development of industry in Kearny dates back to 1875 when the Clark Thread Company of Paisley in Scotland extended its activities to the United States by erecting two large mills in Kearny, and adding two others in 1890. These mills brought to Kearny thousands of Scots immigrants. Many of them would play on Kearny's soccer teams in National Association Football League. Many are buried at Arlington Memorial Park in the Kearny Uplands.

In 1876, the Mile End Thread Mills started operating, giving employment to several hundred operators.

In 1883, the Marshall Flax Spinning Company of England erected a large plant in Kearny, known as the Linen Thread Company. Their need for experienced flax spinners brought an influx of workers from other sections of the British Isles. Families of those early textile workers were the nucleus of Kearny's present population.

The Puraline Manufacturing Company, later called the Arlington Company, which became a subsidiary of E. I. DuPont de Nemours Company, had purchased a large tract of land east of the Arlington Station on the Erie Railroad extending well out, north of the railroad embankment, into the meadowland.

In 1887, Sir Michael Nairn established the Nairn Linoleum Company of Kirkcaldy in Scotland, now the Congoleum Nairn Company of Kearny, giving further impetus to local industrial growth. This also led to the growth in the Scottish American population which in the 1960s was about 21,000, accounting for more than half of the town's residents.

In 1902, the Lovell–Dressel Company, manufacturers of marine and railway lamps and fixtures, located in Kearny adjacent to the Erie Railroad.

Other industries which located in Kearny include: Swift & Company, Koppers Company, Theobald Industries, Standard Tool & Manufacturing, Wilkata Box Company, Harris Steel Company and L & R Manufacturing.

Cargo ships were built at Kearny Yards during World War I, and warships during World War II.

Kearny Works 

Between 1926 and 1986, the Kearny Works of Western Electric employed as many as 24,000 in producing a variety of hardware and supplies for the Bell System and was the home of the "Kearny Standard" for tools and equipment. It was sold by AT&T in 1984, by which time the plant had 4,000 employees who earned a total of $128 million a year, making it one of the county's largest employers. Henry J. Hill, the mayor of Kearny at the time of the AT&T Kearny Works closure, had himself worked 41 years at the facility as a manufacturing manager and retired three years prior to the closure.

Movie and television filming 
In 1982, filming occurred in Kearny at a railroad bridge previously owned by Conrail until closure in 1977. The abandoned bridge, located at the Passaic River is called the NX Bridge and it was used for the motion picture, Annie. Several scenes were done with the bridge in its open position. Locals call this bridge the "Annie Bridge" and has not had freight operations since the closure.

Scenes from the HBO drama series The Sopranos were filmed in Kearny. One of its buildings, used for Satriale's Pork Store, was later razed to prepare for a parking lot. An Irish pub now resides where Satriale's was located.

The film Spinning Gold, which had been delayed during the pandemic for completion, had scenes filmed in Kearny.

The 2022 horror movie, Smile had a scene filmed at Jersey Oil located at 926 Passaic Avenue. The film is attributed as entirely filmed in New Jersey.

Kearny Point has two studios that are part of the film and television industry. Kearny Mayor Al Santos confirmed, "...our vision for Kearny Point as a hub for film and television production. This investment will create employment opportunities and bring increased economic activity to our community."

Geography
According to the United States Census Bureau, the town had a total area of 10.27 square miles (26.61 km2), including 8.84 square miles (22.91 km2) of land and 1.43 square miles (3.70 km2) of water (13.91%).

Unincorporated communities, localities and place names located partially or completely within the town include Arlington, New Jersey, Schuylers Corner and West Arlington.

The town is bordered by East Newark, Harrison, Lyndhurst, North Arlington (both located in Bergen County) and Secaucus. The Passaic River separates the town from Newark and Belleville, both located in Essex County. The Hackensack River separates it from Jersey City.

The town is varied in topography and roughly divided into three parts: the Kearny Uplands, the Kearny Meadows and South Kearny, which is located where the Hackensack and Passaic rivers meet. Main thoroughfares include the eponymous Kearny Avenue (the local segment of Ridge Road / Frank E. Rodgers Boulevard), Bergen Avenue, Midland Avenue, Schuyler Avenue and Passaic Avenue.

A number of small parks running along the Passaic River are collectively called Riverbank Park. The largest, located on the colloquial "Bunnyland Hill", is a gift from Kearny's veterans. It is named after a small zoo named Bunnyland, which was maintained by the local Kiwanis Club, that occupied part of the present Bunnyland Hill in the 20th century. During Kearny's Fourth of July celebrations (which include a fireworks display), Bunnyland Hill is the primary gathering spot for celebrants and observers. The largest park is West Hudson Park, shared with Harrison, which contains a variety of sports fields, recreational areas, and an artificial pond. The second largest recreational zone is the Kearny Playground at Gunnel Oval.

Demographics

2010 census

The Census Bureau's 2006–2010 American Community Survey showed that (in 2010 inflation-adjusted dollars) median household income was $58,698 (with a margin of error of ±$3,838) and the median family income was $66,272 (±$3,803). Males had a median income of $45,360 (±$2,598) versus $38,668 (±$3,893) for females. The per capita income for the borough was $24,977 (±$1,022). About 7.6% of families and 10.3% of the population were below the poverty line, including 14.2% of those under age 18 and 8.1% of those age 65 or over.

2000 census
As of the 2000 United States census there were 40,513 people, 13,539 households, and 9,802 families residing in the town. The population density was 4,433.2 people per square mile (1,711.4/km2). There were 13,872 housing units at an average density of 1,518.0 per square mile (586.0/km2). The racial makeup of the town was 75.75% White, 3.97% African American, 0.37% Native American, 5.50% Asian, 0.07% Pacific Islander, 10.04% from other races, and 4.31% from two or more races. Hispanic or Latino of any race were 27.34% of the population.

There were 13,539 households, out of which 34.6% had children under the age of 18 living with them, 53.8% were married couples living together, 13.2% had a female householder with no husband present, and 27.6% were non-families. 21.8% of all households were made up of individuals, and 8.8% had someone living alone who was 65 years of age or older. The average household size was 2.81 and the average family size was 3.28.

In the town, the population was spread out, with 21.5% under the age of 18, 10.7% from 18 to 24, 35.7% from 25 to 44, 21.3% from 45 to 64, and 10.9% who were 65 years of age or older. The median age was 35 years. For every 100 females, there were 106.6 males. For every 100 females age 18 and over, there were 107.0 males.

The median income for a household in the town was $47,757, and the median income for a family was $54,596. Males had a median income of $38,672 versus $30,620 for females. The per capita income for the town was $20,886. About 6.1% of families and 8.6% of the population were below the poverty line, including 9.1% of those under age 18 and 10.0% of those age 65 or over.

Economy
In 1982, the Kearny Works plant was assessed for property tax purposes at $23.9 million and represented about 7.3 percent of the towns' total tax base. The real estate taxes for the plant were $1.6 million but a closure was upcoming for 1983. According to Mayor Hill, Western Electric was one of the largest taxpayer's for the town. According to Ronnie Connors, assistant tax assessor, the company appealed with the town December 1982 for tax relief and agreement was reduced assessment to between $17 million and $18 million for 1983. With the closures evident, the officials needed to offset the $1.6 million loss by drawing new industry to Kearny with incentives.

Portions of the town are part of an Urban Enterprise Zone (UEZ), one of 32 zones covering 37 municipalities statewide. Kearny was selected in 1983 as one of the initial group of 10 zones chosen to participate in the program. In addition to other benefits to encourage employment and investment within the Zone, shoppers can take advantage of a reduced 3.3125% sales tax rate (half of the % rate charged statewide) at eligible merchants. Established in November 1992, the town's Urban Enterprise Zone status expires in November 2023. Since its inception, there has been $27 million in tax revenue that has been invested based on revenue from the Urban Enterprise Zone.

Government

Local government

Kearny is governed under the Town form of New Jersey municipal government. It is one of nine municipalities (of the 564) statewide that use this form of government. The governing body is comprised of the Mayor and Town Council, who are elected on a partisan basis as part of the November general election. The Mayor is elected directly by the voters at-large to a four-year term of office. The Town Council, comprised of eight members, is elected by the voters to four-year terms of office on a staggered basis, with one of the two seats from each of the four wards coming up for election in two consecutive years followed by two years with no elections. The Mayor and Council operate on a legislative basis, with the Mayor having veto power. The day-to-day operations are the responsibility of the Town Administrator whose duties are specified by local ordinance, and who generally carries out the policies adopted by the Mayor and Council.

, the Mayor of Kearny is Al Santos, who has been mayor since January 1, 2000, and whose current term of office ends December 31, 2025. Before his election as mayor, Santos served as councilman of Kearny's Second Ward for one year. Members of the Town Council are Albino Cardoso (D, 2022; 1st Ward), Marytrine De Castro (D, 2025; 1st Ward), Carol Jean Doyle (D, 2025; 3rd Ward), Eileen Eckel (D, 2022; 3rd Ward), Gerald J. Ficeto (D, 2025; 4th Ward), Richard P. Konopka (D, 2025; 2nd Ward), Susan A. McCurrie (D, 2022; 4th Ward) and Peter Santana (D, 2022; 2nd Ward).

In February 2019, the Town Council appointed Gerald Ficeto to fill the 2nd Ward seat expiring in December 2021 that had been held by Michael D. Landy until he resigned from office in December 2018. in November 2019, Ficeto was elected to serve the balance of the term of office.

On January 7, 2017, 2nd Ward Councilman Jonathan Giordano died, creating a vacancy on the Town Council. In February 2017, Peter Santana was selected unanimously to fill Giordano's seat that expires in December 2018; Santana served on an interim basis until the November 2017 general election, when voters elected him to serve the balance of the term of office.

In February 2015, the Town Council selected Marytrine De Castro, as chosen by the Democratic municipal committee, to fill the vacant First Ward seat expiring in December 2017 that had been held by Alexa Arce until she resigned the previous month. In the November general election, De Castro was elected to serve the balance of the term.

Fire department
The town is protected by the Kearny Fire Department, which operates out of four fire stations. The current Chief of Department is Steve Dyl. Below is a list of fire station locations and apparatus of the Kearny Fire Department.

Federal, state, and county representation
Kearny is split between the 8th and 9th Congressional Districts and is part of New Jersey's 32nd state legislative district. 

In the redistricting that took effect in 2013, 22,572 (about 55%) Kearny residents were placed in the 8th District, with the remaining 18,112 (about 45%) located in the extreme northwest corner of the town placed in the 9th District.

Politics
As of March 2011, there were a total of 16,348 registered voters in Kearny, of which 7,030 (43.0%) were registered as Democrats, 1,922 (11.8%) were registered as Republicans and 7,390 (45.2%) were registered as Unaffiliated. There were 6 voters registered to other parties.

In the 2012 presidential election, Democrat Barack Obama received 68.9% of the vote (7,579 cast), ahead of Republican Mitt Romney with 29.9% (3,293 votes), and other candidates with 1.2% (129 votes), among the 11,076 ballots cast by the town's 17,601 registered voters (75 ballots were spoiled), for a turnout of 62.9%. In the 2008 presidential election, Democrat Barack Obama received 60.4% of the vote (6,953 cast), ahead of Republican John McCain with 37.9% (4,365 votes) and other candidates with 1.1% (121 votes), among the 11,508 ballots cast by the town's 18,057 registered voters, for a turnout of 63.7%. In the 2004 presidential election, Democrat John Kerry received 57.0% of the vote (6,363 ballots cast), outpolling Republican George W. Bush with 41.7% (4,650 votes) and other candidates with 0.5% (87 votes), among the 11,154 ballots cast by the town's 16,633 registered voters, for a turnout percentage of 67.1.

In the 2013 gubernatorial election, Democrat Barbara Buono received 49.5% of the vote (2,667 cast), ahead of Republican Chris Christie with 48.8% (2,634 votes), and other candidates with 1.7% (92 votes), among the 5,597 ballots cast by the town's 18,001 registered voters (204 ballots were spoiled), for a turnout of 31.1%. In the 2009 gubernatorial election, Democrat Jon Corzine received 52.9% of the vote (3,838 ballots cast), ahead of Republican Chris Christie with 38.5% (2,790 votes), Independent Chris Daggett with 5.4% (390 votes) and other candidates with 1.1% (80 votes), among the 7,249 ballots cast by the town's 16,417 registered voters, yielding a 44.2% turnout.

Education

Public schools
The Kearny School District serves public school students in pre-kindergarten through twelfth grade. As of the 2020–21 school year, the district, comprised of seven schools, had an enrollment of 5,251 students and 446.6 classroom teachers (on an FTE basis), for a student–teacher ratio of 11.8:1. Schools in the district (with 2020–21 enrollment data from the National Center for Education Statistics) are 
Franklin Elementary School with 862 students in grades Pre-K–6, 
Garfield Elementary School with 463 students in grades Pre-K–6, 
Roosevelt Elementary School with 379 students in grades Pre-K–6, 
Schuyler Elementary School with 430 students in grades Pre-K–6, 
Washington Elementary School with 474 students in grades Pre-K–6, 
Lincoln Middle School with 807 students in grades 7–8 and 
Kearny High School with 1,750 students in grades 9–12.

Private schools
Schools in Kearny include:
Kearny Christian Academy, a Christian school founded in 1981 by the City of Hope International Church that serves students in kindergarten through twelfth grade.
Mt. Carmel Guild School
The Little Neighborhood Learning Center
Happy Time Preschool & Day Care

In the face of declining enrollment, the Roman Catholic Archdiocese of Newark closed Mater Dei Academy at the conclusion of the 2011–2012 school year. Mater Dei had been opened three years earlier as the merger of two existing schools, St. Stephen's and Holy Cross (the latter in Harrison), but attendance declined from 250 in its first year to 170 in its final year. Other former Catholic schools in Kearny include: Sacred Heart School and St. Cecilia School.

Library and museum
The Kearny Public Library is one of New Jersey's remaining Carnegie libraries, and houses a museum on its third floor which mounts exhibitions related to the history and culture of the town and has a collection of artifacts related to the town's namesake.

Transportation

Roads and highways

Several roadways pass through and intersect in the town. The Belleville Turnpike (Route 7) forms the northern border of the town with North Arlington and crosses the Rutgers Street Bridge over the Passaic River into Belleville. Kearny Avenue passes through the town and continues north as Ridge Road, the beginning of Route 17. U.S. Route 1/9 (Pulaski Skyway) and US 1/9 Truck pass through. The Essex Freeway (Interstate 280) passes through the town and ends at Interstate 95 (the New Jersey Turnpike eastern and western spurs) at the tollgate for Exit 15W.

Public transportation
NJ Transit offers bus service to the Port Authority Bus Terminal in Midtown Manhattan and to other New Jersey communities. Bus service to Newark is available on the 1, 30, 40, and 76 routes.

Kearny was formerly served by trains of both the Erie Railroad's Newark Branch (later Erie-Lackawanna and then Conrail's Newark Industrial Branch) and its Greenwood Lake Division (later the Erie-Lackawanna's Greenwood Lake-Boonton Line; and Conrail and New Jersey Transit's Boonton Line) which stopped at the now-abandoned Arlington station. Newark Branch passenger service was terminated in October, 1966. But freight service continued until 2005, when the last remaining shipper, Spar-Tech PolyCom, shut down. However freight service on the Newark side is still active.   New Jersey Transit discontinued Boonton Line service in 2002 when the Montclair Connection was opened. Through the early 1970s trains also stopped at a second station along this route known as West Arlington. This station was just to the east of the now abandoned WR Draw movable bridge. Prior to April 30, 1967, a station in South Kearny, was served by the Central Railroad of New Jersey's Newark and New York Railroad via the PD Draw over the Passaic River. This station was popular with employees of the giant Western Electric plant, and other industries in the area. In the final years of this service a pair of rush hour trains ran in each direction between South Kearny, and the CNJ's Broad Street Station in downtown Newark, as well as a single rush hour round trip between South Kearny, and Plainfield.  This train operated via Elizabethport, and the CNJ main line. Kearny is also the location of the Meadows Maintenance Complex, the primary maintenance facility for NJ Transit rail operations. 
  

Notable people

People who were born in, residents of, or otherwise closely associated with Kearny include:

 Tomasz Adamek (born 1976), Polish professional heavyweight boxer who is the former WBC Light Heavyweight Champion and the former IBF & IBO & The Ring Cruiserweight Champion
 Karen Akunowicz (born 1978), award-winning chef, Top Chef contestant
 Marcello Borges (born 1997), soccer player who currently plays college soccer at the University of Michigan
 Rachel Breton (born 1990), soccer striker and defender who played for Sky Blue FC and New Jersey Wildcats
 Davey Brown (1898–1970), U.S. soccer forward who was inducted into the US Soccer Hall of Fame
 Marques Brownlee (born 1993), YouTube personality who reviews technology
 John F. Cali (1928–1992), politician who served three terms in the New Jersey General Assembly, representing the 30th Legislative District from 1974 to 1980.
 Guy W. Calissi (–1980), New Jersey Superior Court judge who lived in an orphanage here
 Gary Michael Cappetta (born 1952), professional wrestling ring announcer, author, voice over artist, screenwriter and stage performer
 Ownie Carroll (1902–1975), Major League Baseball pitcher who played nine seasons in the major, from 1925 to 1934
 Jennifer Dore (born 1971), rower who competed in women's quadruple sculls at the 2000 Summer Olympics
 George Dunlap (1908–2003), golfer best known for winning the United States Amateur Championship in 1933
 James Ford (born 1889), soccer outside right who earned one cap with the  U.S. national team in 1916.
 Santiago Formoso (born 1953), soccer defender who played five seasons in the North American Soccer League.
 Ted Gillen (born 1968), former professional soccer player
 Franco Gamero (born 1990), international footballer who has played for the Puerto Rico national football team.
 Albert Gonzalez (born 1981), government informant and computer criminal
 Ed Halicki (born 1950), former professional baseball pitcher with a no-hitter to his credit, pitched on August 24, 1975, against the New York Mets
 John Harkes (born 1967), professional soccer player
 Al Hartley (1921–2003), comic book writer-artist known for his work on Archie Comics
 Fred A. Hartley Jr. (1909–1969), New Jersey Congressman best known for being the House of Representatives sponsor of the Taft-Hartley Act
 Herbie Haymer (1916–1949), jazz saxophonist
 John Hemingsley, soccer center forward who played the first two U.S. national team games in 1916.
 Frank Iero (born 1981), rhythm guitarist and backup vocalist for My Chemical Romance
 James F. Kelley (1902–1996), President of Seton Hall College (since renamed as Seton Hall University) from 1936 to 1949
 Jeffrey Klepacki (born 1968), three-time US Olympian in rowing and three-time world champion
 Buzz Kulik (1922–1999), film director and producer
 Joe Kyrillos (born 1960), politician who served in the New Jersey Senate from 1992 to 2018, where he represents the 13th Legislative District
 Joan Lippincott (born 1935), concert organist
 Monroe Jay Lustbader (1931–1996), politician who served in the New Jersey General Assembly from 1992 until his death, where he represented the 21st Legislative District
 Kevin Maguire (born 1960), comic book artist
 Paul McCurrie (1929–2020), lawyer and politician who served in the New Jersey General Assembly
 Tony Meola (born 1969), professional soccer player
 Dots Miller (1886–1923), Major League Baseball player from 1909 to 1921
 Michael Moran (born 1962), author / analyst of international affairs and digital documentarian
 Tony Mottola (1918–2004), jazz guitarist
 Jim Murphy (1947–2022), author of more than nonfiction and fiction books for children, young adults, and general audiences, including more than 30 about American history
 Shamus O'Brien (1907–1981), soccer player inducted in 1990 into the National Soccer Hall of Fame
 Brian O'Hara (born 1979), law enforcement official who is serving as the 54th Chief of the Minneapolis Police Department
 Hugh O'Neill (born 1954), soccer player who played in the NASL, ASL, and MISL
 Greg Pason (born 1966),  National Secretary of the Socialist Party USA
 George Paxton (–1989), big band jazz leader, saxophonist, composer and producer
 Matt Pelissier (born 1979), drummer for My Chemical Romance
 Bill Raftery (born 1943), college basketball analyst and former college basketball player for La Salle University
 Tab Ramos (born 1966), retired soccer midfielder
 James H. Rupp (1918–1998), Illinois state senator, Mayor of Monmouth, Illinois, and businessman
 Harold Hill Smith (1910–1994), geneticist who first fused a human cell and a plant cell
 Bob Stanley (born 1954), professional baseball relief pitcher who played for the Boston Red Sox
 Archie Stark (1897–1985), soccer pioneer in the United States and member of the National Soccer Hall of Fame
 Ray Toro (born 1977), My Chemical Romance lead guitarist
 John Patrick Washington (1908–1943), Roman Catholic priest; one of the Four Chaplains, who gave their lives to save other soldiers during the sinking of the troop transport Dorchester during World War II
 Alex Webster (1931–2012), fullback and halfback in the National Football League for the New York Giants, who was later head coach of the Giants from 1969 to 1973
 Dick Weisgerber (1915–1984), professional football player for the Green Bay Packers
 Kenneth G. Wiman (born 1930), U.S. Coast Guard Rear Admiral

References

External links

Scene from Annie at the Kearny Passaic River bridge

 
1867 establishments in New Jersey
New Jersey Meadowlands District
New Jersey Urban Enterprise Zones
Populated places established in 1867
New Jersey populated places on the Hackensack River
Town form of New Jersey government
Towns in Hudson County, New Jersey